Michael Thomas Buskey (born January 13, 1949) is an American former professional baseball infielder, who played in Major League Baseball (MLB) for the Philadelphia Phillies in . Buskey batted and threw right-handed.

Baseball career

Scholastically, Buskey attended Terra Nova High School in Pacifica, California and University of San Francisco. Buskey was inducted into the USF Dons Sports Hall of Fame, in 1980. Buskey was originally signed by the Chicago White Sox as an undrafted amateur free agent, prior to the 1971 season.

After spending five seasons in Minor League Baseball (MiLB) where he progressed steadily through the White Sox farm system, Buskey was dealt along with Jim Kaat to the Phillies for Dick Ruthven, Alan Bannister and Roy Thomas on December 10, 1975. Buskey, primarily a shortstop, spent the entire  and most of the campaigns with the Phillies’ Triple-A affiliate Oklahoma City 89ers. He finally received the call to the big leagues on September 5, 1977, at the age of 28. This was to be Buskey's only MLB cup of coffee, as he made his last big league game appearance on October 1, 1977.

Buskey's MLB career statistical line reads: 6 games played, 7 at bats, 2 hits, .286 batting average, 1 run scored, 1 run batted in, 1 hit-by-pitch, .375 on-base percentage, and .571 slugging percentage.

References

External links

Mike Buskey at Baseball Gauge

Baseball players from San Francisco
Major League Baseball shortstops
1949 births
Living people
Philadelphia Phillies players
Denver Bears players
Gulf Coast White Sox players
Appleton Foxes players
Charleston Charlies players
Iowa Oaks players
Oklahoma City 89ers players
Knoxville Sox players
San Francisco Dons baseball players